Adult Contemporary is a chart published by Billboard ranking the top-performing songs in the United States in the adult contemporary music (AC) market.  In 2007, 11 different songs topped the chart in 53 issues of the magazine, based on weekly airplay data from radio stations compiled by Nielsen Broadcast Data Systems.

In the first issue of Billboard of the new year, Hall & Oates held the top spot with their version of the Christmas carol "It Came Upon a Midnight Clear", which was in its second week at number one.  The following week it was displaced by country music group Rascal Flatts with its version of the song "What Hurts the Most".  In the issue dated February 24, John Mayer reached number one with his song "Waiting on the World to Change".  Over the next five months, the track would have seven separate runs at number one totalling sixteen weeks in the top spot, the most by any song during the year.  Mayer's song was displaced from the top spot once by "Unwritten" by Natasha Bedingfield, twice by "How to Save a Life" by the Fray, and three times by "Chasing Cars" by Snow Patrol, but on each occasion it returned to number one after a single week.  The song was displaced at number one for the final time in the issue dated July 28, when "Everything" by Michael Bublé began a three-week run at number one.  "Waiting on the World to Change" was Mayer's first AC number one and won the Grammy for Best Male Pop Vocal Performance at the 49th Grammy Awards.

The longest unbroken run at number one in 2007 was eight weeks, achieved by "Home" by Daughtry, the band led by former American Idol finalist Chris Daughtry.  The song eventually totalled eleven weeks in the top spot in three runs, all three of which were ended by Fergie's song "Big Girls Don't Cry".  The latter song was the only track to top both the AC listing and Billboards all-genre chart, the Hot 100, in 2007; Fergie had two Hot 100 number ones during the year, but "Big Girls Don't Cry" was not only the only one to also top the AC chart but the sole song by the former Black Eyed Peas singer to enter the AC listing at all.  The final two AC number ones of the year were both Christmas-themed, continuing a theme which began in the early 21st century, when stations of the relevant format began devoting their playlists exclusively to seasonal songs in December.  In the issue of Billboard dated December 15, Kimberley Locke reached number one with her version of "Frosty the Snowman", and the following week Josh Groban took the top spot with his recording of "I'll Be Home for Christmas".  Locke's single week in the top spot meant that she had achieved a number one with a Christmas-themed song in three consecutive Decembers.

Chart history

See also
2007 in music

References

2007
United States Adult Contemporary
2007 in American music